Oil well shooting is a method of increasing production of an oil well by removing obstructions to drilling, straightening crooked holes, preventing water penetration, and/or increase the flow of oil. 

Prior to 1910, a shell, made of dynamite and a sheet metal casing were lowered into a well and detonated by a blasting cap with a fuse.   By 1918, the practice had evolved to use blasting gelatin, a mixture of nitroglycerin, guncotton and wood pulp.

Notable professionals
Merle Haggard worked as an oil well shooter

Footnotes

References

External links

Drilling technology